The Institute for Occupational Safety and Health of the German Social Accident Insurance (IFA) is a German institute located in Sankt Augustin near Bonn and is a main department of the German Social Accident Insurance. Belonging to the Statutory Accident Insurance means that IFA is a non-profit institution.

Tasks 
The IFA supports the German institutions for social accident insurance and their organisations in solving scientific and technical problems relating to occupational safety and health. The missions of IFA contain the following objectives:
 research, development and investigations
 testing of products and material samples
 workplace measurements and advice
 participation in standardisation and regulation setting bodies
 technical information and expertise
 testing and certification of products and quality management systems for producers and companies. The certified products and manufacturers can be found in the certificate database

The IFA provides international proficiency testing (PT) schemes for laboratories and measuring stations.

The IFA works closely with 23 international OSH institutes and is member of PEROSH, a European research federation.

The director of the IFA is member of the Zero Accident Forum.

Fields of activity of the IFA 
 Chemical/biological hazards (dusts, gases, vapours) 
 Analysis of metals and selected inorganic pollutants 
 Analysis of organic and inorganic pollutants (Liquid chromatography) 
 Analysis of organic pollutants (Gas chromatography) 
 Biological agents 
 Dust - Fibres 
 Emission of hazardous substances 
 Exposure assessment 
 Exposure database (MEGA) 
 Measuring system exposure assessment of the German Social Accident Insurance Institutions (MGU) 
 Personal protective equipment (PPE) against chemical/biological hazards 
 Protective measures 
 Substance- and product-related data (GESTIS, e.g. GESTIS Substance Database, ISi, GESTIS-Stoffenmanager) 
 Techniques for measurement of vapours and gases 
 Techniques for particle measurement 
 Toxicology of industrial chemicals 
 Dust explosions
 Physical hazards 
 Database on physical exposure 
 Hand-arm vibration 
 Hot/cold surfaces 
 Noise measurement 
 Noise protection/Hearing protection 
 PPE against physical hazards 
 Radiation 
 Whole body vibration 
 Ergonomics
 Ergonomic methods and processes for recording and evaluating work-induced load on the musculo-skeletal system
 Conducting measurements using the CUELA system. CUELA is a personal measurement system employing modern sensor technology to be worn on the work clothing. The associated software interprets the measured data automatically in accordance with ergonomic criteria and helps to implement prevention measures.
 Ergonomic design of human-machine interfaces
 Planning and setting up exposure databases on physical loads 
 Ergonomic aspects of head-mounted displays and smart glasses
 Risk assessment of exoskeletons
 Studies into the promotion of physical activity by means of dynamic office workplaces
 Epidemiology
 Accident prevention/Product safety
 Fluid power 
 Material science and tools 
 Protective devices and control systems 
 Safety of machines and installations 
 Structural engineering/Constructional elements 
 Transport and traffic 
 Collaborative robots (COBOTS)
 Virtual reality in human-system interaction
 Industrial security
 Trustworthy artificial intelligence
 Interdisciplinary services
 Basic and further training 
 Co-operations 
 Information management 
 Information technology 
 Media contact 
 Risk assessment

Publications 
Publications referring the work results of IFA can be found in a database.

The IFA is editor of Databases on hazardous substances (GESTIS): GESTIS Substance Database offers information to about 8,800 substances and is free of charge. A mobile version suitable for smartphones and tablets is also available. The GESTIS Biological Agents Database contains information for safe handling of biological agents at the workplace. GESTIS-Stoffenmanager® is an online tool for risk assessment during activities with hazardous substances. GESTIS-DUST-EX is a database on combustion and explosion characteristics of dusts. GESTIS also offers a database with a collection of international occupational limit values for hazardous substances, additionally available as a mobile app.
IFA’s exposure database MEGA provides data on hazardous chemicals gathered through atmospheric measurements and material analyses since 1972. It is determined to support the institutions for statutory accident insurance and prevention with epidemiological issues or retrospective considerations related to occupational diseases.

History 
The precursor institute of the IFA – dedicated to dust abatement - was founded in 1935 and reestablished in 1953. In 1976 the institute for noise abatement in Mainz was included. In 1980 the institute – then named BIA – moved to Sankt Augustin near Bonn. In 2003 the name changed to BGIA and in 2007 the institute obtained its present-day name on occasion of the fusion of the German social accident insurance institutions in the commercial and the public sector. Since the beginning of 2010 the abbreviated designation is IFA.

External links 
 IFA website
 IFA/IAG-Database publications
 IFA-Manual
 IFA-Arbeitsmappe

References 

Occupational safety and health organizations
Medical and health organisations based in North Rhine-Westphalia
Organisations based in Bonn